Xilinhot (Mongolian: , ,) is a county-level city which serves as the seat of government for the Xilin Gol league in Inner Mongolia, People's Republic of China.

History
During the Ming dynasty, the elder brother of Genghis Khan lived in Xilinhot area. As a result, the local Mongols were called Abganar, because Abgal in Mongolian means paternal uncle. When in the first half of the 17th century the Mongols submitted to the Manchu, the Abganar territories were divided into two banners: Abganar-Tszoitsi (Abganar left wing) and Abganar-Yuitsi (Abganar right wing). These wings were commanded by men in the rank of princes beile. The Abgal and Hotsit tribes also lived in the area. Xinlihot was renamed Beizi Temple after the Qianlong Emperor built the Beizi Temple in 1743. Today, the Beizi temple is one of the largest temples on the Xilin Gol grassland.

In 1914, Beizi Temple was included in the newly founded Chahar Special Administrative Region, which became the Chahar Province in 1928. Later it was included in the Inner Mongolia Autonomous Region. In 1953, the county was renamed Xilinhot, and then Abahanaer Banner in 1956. In 1983, it was approved for classification as a county-level city by the state council, and once more renamed Xilinhot.

Geography

Climate
Xilinhot experiences a cold semi-arid climate (Köppen BSk) with long, very dry, and bitter winters and short, hot summers. With monthly percent possible sunshine ranging from 59 percent in July to 73 percent in February, sunshine is abundant year-round. The city receives 2,970 hours of sunshine per year; due to the aridity, the diurnal temperature variation frequently approaches and exceeds .

Economy
The market of the area is centered in Xilinhot and cattle is of particular importance.

Culture and tourism
The historic center of Xilinhot contains an artistic temple.

The Naadam festival, a Mongolian feast, is celebrated every year. Naadam is a gathering of the Mongolian people that involves wrestling, horse trading, costume contests, horse racing, etc.  It's the Mongolian summer festival with festival attendees wearing colorful costumes. Colorful yurts are set up to serve food and trinkets and supplies.

Mongolian culture is prevalent in the city scene; tapestries and monumental statues of Genghis Khan adorn homes, shops, and street corners.

Tourists can stay at nearby yurt resorts, where there are large yurts for dining surrounded by smaller individual yurts for sleeping. The Xilinhot countryside is marked by rolling grasslands populated by Mongolians who keep horses, sheep, goats, and cows.  Mongolian meals consist of mutton, beef, cabbage, and other fruits and vegetables.

Cuisine
The diet of the area is centered around the local dairy and meat production. Products regularly eaten by residents include horse milk yogurt, milk, tofu, milk skin, beef and mutton string, hand meat, and grilled lamb.

Transportation
Xilinhot Airport has regular flights to Beijing on Air China and China United Airlines. The airport is also served by Tianjin Airlines with multiple daily flights to Hohhot and a seasonal daily flight to Tianjin; there are also occasional direct flights to other major cities.

The K7917 train connects Xilinhot with the national rail network and departs daily for Hohhot and Baotou.

China National Highway 207 and China National Highway 303 both terminate in the Xilinhot area. The S27 Xilingol-Kalgan Expressway also ends in a suburb of Xilinhot.

External links

References

Cities in Inner Mongolia
County-level divisions of Inner Mongolia